Before 1688 no sixth rate carried more than 20 guns. At the start of the Anglo-French War in 1688 the British captured four 20 plus gunned French vessels, that were rated by the French as sixth rates. The British Admiralty submitted a requirement to the Navy Board for a 'standard' sixth rate of 20 guns on the upper deck with four smaller guns on the quarterdeck. The vessel proposed by the Navy Board had an estimated cost of £1,676.10.0d per ship with another £2,513 for materials for completion. Initially fourteen ships were ordered, Batch 1 of four vessels in July 1693, Batch 2 of eight vessels in spring 1694, Batch 3 of two vessels in March 1695 with a further four in 1696. This first standardized group of sixth rates became known as the Maidstone Group.

Design and specifications
The initial order was for fourteen vessels spread over three building seasons with another four added in 1696. The construction of the vessels was evenly split between Dockyard-built vessels and contracted vessels. As with most vessels of this time period only order and launch dates are available. Each ship was built to a generalized specification with dimensional creep accruing in all vessels. The dimensional data listed here is the general specification, whereas the actual dimensions where known will be listed with each ship. The tonnage calculation would be .

The initial gun armament would be twenty sakers mounted on wooden trucks located on the upper deck (UD) with a further four 3-pounders mounted on wooden trucks on the quarterdeck (QD). A saker or sacar was a muzzle loading smooth bore gun of 1,400 pounds in weight with a 31/2 inch bore firing a 51/2 pound shot with a 51/2 pound powder charge. In 1703 the armament would be established at twenty 6-pounders mounted on wooden trucks on the upper deck with four 4-pounders on the quarterdeck.

Ships of the Maidstone Group

Notes

Citations

References
 Winfield, British Warships in the Age of Sail (1603 – 1714), by Rif Winfield, published by Seaforth Publishing, England © 2009, EPUB , Chapter 6, The Sixth Rates, Vessels acquired from 18 December 1688, Sixth Rates of 20 guns and up to 26 guns, Maidstone Group
 Colledge, Ships of the Royal Navy, by J.J. Colledge, revised and updated by Lt Cdr Ben Warlow and Steve Bush, published by Seaforth Publishing, Barnsley, Great Britain, © 2020, e  (EPUB)

 

Corvettes of the Royal Navy
Naval ships of the United Kingdom